The HK36 was an experimental assault rifle introduced by Heckler & Koch in the early 1970s. At the time, research in small-caliber military cartridges had become more popular thanks to the United States' adoption and combat use of the M16 and its 5.56×45mm round. 

The HK36 rifle fired a 4.6×36 mm round whose bullet has a "spoon point" (German: Löffelspitz) designed by CETME's Dr. Gunther Voss. Beyond that point, the bullet lost velocity very quickly.

Operation
The HK36 used H&K's delayed blowback system, with a four-position selector switch for the firing mode. In order from top to bottom, these were safe (marked "0"), single-shot ("1"), full-automatic ("25" or "30") and controlled burst ("3")—however, the weapon was intended to be available with 2-, 3-, 4- or 5-round burst mode.

Ejection of empty cartridge cases was to the right, while the bolt remained open once all ammunition had been expended.

Magazine
Early versions of the weapon had a standard detachable box magazine made from stamped metal.

The method of reloading for the later prototypes was an unusual departure from modern systems, being intended to reduce weight along with eliminating the handling of individual rounds. The rifle had a metal box mounted permanently below the receiver, in front of the trigger guard; this magazine had a side-opening "door" through which a pre-packaged box of 30 cartridges could be inserted once a knob on the rifle had been pulled down. The box had an open top and bottom, closed by tape, so that the magazine follower could push the rounds up into the rifle during firing.

Variants
As mentioned, early models used a conventional detachable box magazine while later versions had the integral one. In addition, most of the rifles appear to have been fitted with a telescoping stock of a completely different type than that fitted to most other Heckler & Koch weapons (such as the G3 and MP5), but some are known with a fixed, plastic stock.

Legacy
Despite never being accepted for military service, the rifle was notable for introducing the three-round burst concept and integrated optics to Heckler & Koch weapons.  The various innovations gave H&K some interesting ideas for the future, which have resurfaced in the Heckler & Koch MP7 PDW and G36 rifle.

See also
List of assault rifles

Notes

External links
HKPRO

Assault rifles
Roller-delayed blowback firearms
3